Carlton Landing is a master-planned resort town in Pittsburg County, Oklahoma, United States, conceived and built by real estate developer Grant Humphreys. It was established on October 21, 2013, and had a population of 94 as of 2020.

Geography
Carlton Landing is located at  (35.204735, -95.544918). It is built along the shore of Lake Eufaula, a reservoir located on the Canadian River.

History
Carlton Landing was conceived by Grant Humphreys, real estate developer and son of former Oklahoma City Mayor Kirk Humphreys. He was inspired by visits to Seaside, Florida, one of the first communities designed according to the tenets of New Urbanism. Humphreys, whose family had vacationed at a lake house on Lake Eufaula, Oklahoma since 1971, thought the area would be the ideal site for a similar community. His real estate company, The Humphreys Company, began to purchase land adjacent to the lake in 2007 and within 12 months had acquired approximately 1,600 acres. Over the next two years Humphreys, through his real estate company, contracted with various urban planners, architects, and engineers to design what would become a pedestrian-centric neighborhood with lots for 2,000 homes. The final design was laid out by Miami-based architect Andres Duany. It included walking paths, shared public areas, homes with large front porches, a 200-acre preserve with walking trails, and a 60-acre area reserved for organic farming.

Site and infrastructure work began in 2010 and residential construction started in 2011. The first residents were Grant and Jen Humphreys and their family, who moved into Carlton Landing in 2012. By November 2019 the community had 200 homes, a charter school and an organic farm.

In June 2019, the town water district was fined $100,000 by the Oklahoma Department of Environmental Quality for repeatedly discharging wastewater without first obtaining approvals from the DEQ. The water district discharged millions of gallons of partially treated wastewater into Lake Eufaula between March 2018 and June 2019. Humphreys promised that the town would build a water treatment plant capable of handling 80,000-160,000 gallons a day, versus the current 18,000 gallon per day capacity.

Demographics

References

Towns in Oklahoma
Towns in Pittsburg County, Oklahoma
Populated places established in 2013
New Urbanism communities